Sam Denby (born March 17, 1998) is an American YouTuber, best known for creating the edutainment YouTube channels Wendover Productions, Half as Interesting, Extremities, and Jet Lag: The Game. Across all of Denby's channels, he has accumulated more than a billion views.

Career

Wendover Productions
 Denby's YouTube channel Wendover Productions has over 3.7 million subscribers and more than 557 million total video views. His videos most commonly feature the topics of logistics, most notably those of aviation, as well as geography and economics. The Wendover Productions video about tourism in Iceland received significant attention from Iceland's national newspapers. Wendover Productions is based in Aspen, Colorado.

Half as Interesting 
In 2017, Denby created Half as Interesting, which as of January 20, 2022 has over 500 million total views. It's meant as a lighter, satirical continuation of a Wendover Productions playlist series entitled That Wikipedia List (TWL) which drew inspiration from unusual articles.

Extremities
In June 2019, Denby created a scripted podcast called Extremities about the logistics of living in the world's most isolated populated locations. The show's format has since been modified into short documentaries exclusive to the streaming service Nebula with the same concept.

Jet Lag: The Game

Denby's YouTube channel Jet Lag: The Game hosts game shows created by Denby and Half as Interesting's writers, Ben Doyle and Adam Chase. Inspired by The Amazing Race, the first game show hosted on the channel was a variant of Connect Four—described by Wired as "what might be the world’s largest Connect Four game ever constructed" — where the aim is to create a vertical or horizontal line of four American states. Jet Lag's second season, Circumnavigation, was a race to circumnavigate the world in 100 hours, while the third, Tag EUR It, is a game of tag played across Western Europe. The fourth season, Battle 4 America, premiered on December 7, 2022 and ended on January 4, 2023, with the goal to claim the most American states in four days. The fifth season, Race to the End of the World, is set in New Zealand and premiered on March 1, 2023. All travel on the show is offset by a factor of 10 via Gold Standard carbon credits. As of January 11, 2023, the channel has over 405,000 subscribers and more than 18.69 million total video views.

Personal life
Denby was "born and raised" in Washington, D.C. In 2018, Denby stated he had been living in Edinburgh, Scotland for the past two years for university studies   he was studying international business. Denby stated he has lived in Colorado  somewhere near Aspen.

References

Citations

Further reading

External links
 

Living people
YouTube channels launched in 2010
American expatriates in Scotland
People from Washington, D.C.
Educational and science YouTubers
1998 births
American YouTubers
English-language YouTube channels